Stefan Iten (born 5 February 1985) is a Swiss former football defender.

International career 
Iten is a former youth international and was in the Swiss U-17 squad that won the 2002 U-17 European Championships.

Honours 
 UEFA U-17 European Champion: 2002

External links
FC Vaduz profile

References

1985 births
Footballers from Zürich
Living people
Swiss men's footballers
Switzerland youth international footballers
Association football defenders
Grasshopper Club Zürich players
FC Wohlen players
FC Vaduz players
FC Winterthur players
Swiss Challenge League players
Swiss Super League players
Swiss 1. Liga (football) players
2. Liga Interregional players
Swiss expatriate footballers
Swiss expatriate sportspeople in Liechtenstein
Expatriate footballers in Liechtenstein